Otocryptis is a genus of agamid lizards from the Indian subcontinent. It is the sister group for the clade formed by Sitana and Sarada. The divergence is estimated to have occurred about 12 million years ago.

Otocryptis are terrestrial lizards that can use bipedal locomotion.

Species
There are two species:
Otocryptis nigristigma Bahir and Silva, 2005
Otocryptis wiegmanni Wagler, 1830 – Wiegmann's agama

References

Otocryptis
Lizard genera
Taxa named by Johann Georg Wagler